2016 ACC tournament may refer to:

 2016 ACC men's basketball tournament
 2016 ACC women's basketball tournament
 2016 ACC men's soccer tournament
 2016 ACC women's soccer tournament
 2016 Atlantic Coast Conference baseball tournament
 2016 Atlantic Coast Conference softball tournament